Parcels are an Australian electropop five-piece formed in Byron Bay, Australia, in 2014. Today they are based in Berlin, Germany. The band's line-up is composed of keyboardist Louie Swain, keyboardist/guitarist Patrick Hetherington, bassist Noah Hill, drummer Anatole "Toto" Serret, and guitarist Jules Crommelin.

Signed to French label Kitsuné, the band rose to prominence after collaborating with the electronic duo Daft Punk on the production and writing of their 2017 single "Overnight".

In 2018 Parcels released their self-titled debut record with singles "Tieduprightnow", "Bemyself", "Lightenup" and "Withorwithout". Parcels describe themselves as "sort of a blend between electro-pop and disco-soul".

Formation 
Band members Swain, Hetherington, Hill, Serret, and Crommelin all grew up in the beach town of Byron Bay, New South Wales located on the east coast of Australia, known for its bohemian, surf and anti-development culture.

The members attended nearby high schools. Swain, Hetherington, Hill, and Crommelin attended Cape Byron Rudolf Steiner School, Serret attended Byron Bay High School.

Music before Parcels 
The band members were involved in a host of musical projects together before the formation of Parcels, playing music together in and out of different bands since they were 13 years old. They played in different groups experimenting with genres of funk, folk, metal and bluegrass. Serret and Crommelin were the only two members of Parcels who had not previously played music together.

Members Swain and Hetherington had formed as an acoustic folk duo named 'Louie and Patrick' releasing two digital albums via Bandcamp, 'We Thought A Kitten Might Lift Our Mother's Spirits' in April 2013 and 'We Are Not Convinced There Has Been Any Significant Improvement' in May 2014.

Swain, Hetherington and non-Parcels members Merryn Boller and Nick Scales had formed as a roots group, uploading to national youth broadcaster Triple J's unearthed website as "The Sugar Spinners' in 2013. The Sugar Spinners won the 2013 BluesFest busking competition.

Swain, Hetherington, Serret and non-Parcels member Jade Deegan formed as a rock, roots band as 'Lifeline'. The band received airplay on Triple J's unearthed station and won a spot at the 2012 Splendour in the Grass line-up.

Swain, Hethrington, Hill and aforementioned non-Parcels vocalist Merryn Boller formed as 'Potato Potato' receiving airplay on national youth broadcaster Triple J's unearthed station and winning a spot at the 2013 Splendour in the Grass line-up.

In their final year of high school in 2014, the five boys, Swain, Hetherington, Hill, Serret and Crommelin, formed as Parcels. The story behind the name 'Parcels' differs from source to source. Consistently, the members report having taken the name from an old train sign that resided at Swain's parent's house. In one interview the sign is said to be seen in Swain's parent's pastry cafè. Another says that Swain stole the sign from their local train station and hung it in his basement.

Byron to Berlin 
After six months of playing shows in Australia the band relocated to Berlin, Germany. The band notes watching a video in high school of band The Whitest Boy Alive performing in a shop window in Mitte, Germany as influential to the move, stating that the "huge crowd on the street [...] was super cool". Berlin is known for its culture of music creativity being a hub for new wave, techno, electro and hip-hop and its distinctive subculture flair. The lure of existing in the German city's melting-pot of music and culture has attracted many international artists including David Bowie and Nick Cave, two artists that Parcels has noted as influential to their sound.

The band lived in a small one-bedroom apartment for the first three months with "three [band members] on the bed two on the couch".

For almost the entire first year in Berlin the band did not play any live shows. Their first performance was put together at a small café in Berlin.

History

2015-2016: Clockscared EP and working with Daft Punk 
Parcels released their first EP Clockscared on 2 March 2015 while they were starting out in electronic music. The EP has six listed tracks and was an independent release made with a single condenser mic.

The release of Clockscared caught the attention of Parisian label Kitsuné, which signed the band in 2015.

In 2016, Parcels played their first show in France at Paris' Les Bains bar with Daft Punk in the audience. The duo invited Parcels to their studio. Parcels say that they had not initially planned to create a song with Daft Punk, "it was just like, let's get creative together and see what happens".

The band showed Daft Punk an early demo of "Overnight" which they agreed to work on. The track was in production for over the course of a year with many studio trips and months in the studio. In an interview on the process, Parcel's keyboardist Patrick Hetherington said that "First we spent seven days in the studio with them, every day from 12 midday up until 4 in the morning, literally working on it overnight."

On 21 June 2017, Parcels released single "Overnight" with production and co-writing credits from Daft Punk's Guy-Manuel de Homem-Christo and Thomas Bangalter. The single entered the French charts at position 62, and remained for 11 weeks. The song ended up being Daft Punk's final song produced together prior to the duo's split in 2021.

The single was not listed on the band's following album Parcels, with the band stating that "including it would've felt dishonest to the rest of the record," noting that the time between recording the tracks on their debut and "Overnight" was two years difference and would taint the historical "snapshot" of the album.

"Overnight" was performed on Conan in September 2017 as Parcels' US television debut.

2017 Hideout 
27 January 2017, Parcels released their second EP Hideout, which was the band's first project with Kitsunè and was entirely computer-produced.

Hideout centers around the theme of inner turmoil despite external serenity, which impels the desire to "hide out". The band has linked this concept with their own experience relocating to Berlin.

It was after the release of Hideout and the exposure of "Overnight" that Parcels began to headline their own European shows.

Parcels opened for Northern Irish indie band Two Door Cinema Club for their European tour in February 2017 and French pop band Phoenix for their European Tour in  September of the same year. Both bands are also signed to the Kitsunè label.

2018-2019: Parcels 
Ahead of their debut album, Parcels in April 2018 released the single "Tieduprightnow", engineered and recorded by British producer, Ed Bentley, at Bakermoon Studios. In July 2018, they released the single "Bemyself", and in September 2018, they released the single "Lightenup"

On 12 October 2018, the band released Parcels, their first full length album (Recorded and mixed at Bewake Studios, former Mesanic Music in Berlin by Martin "Lucky" Waschkowitsch), and including the hit single 'Tieduprightnow', recorded in Berlin at Bakermoon Studios by Ed Bentley, with Because Music, Kitsunè and Caroline Music. In an interview, Hill said the album's sound was "a little less slick, and a little less disco", than previous records. The album was 12 tracks, spanning just over 50 minutes. Singles "Tieduprightnow", "Lightenup", "Withorwithout", and "Tape" were accompanied by music videos.

Lead single "Tieduprightnow" peaked at number 48 on the Mexican Billboard charts for one week. and just missed the Triple J Hottest 100 of 2018, charting at number 103. The single's film clip gave recognition to the band's Byron Bay roots and "play[ed on] the Australian stereotype". The clip was directed by Beatrice Pegard and shows the band driving through their home town and the Australian North Coast, depicting quintessential Australia surf lifestyle and culture. Pegard, for the Australian publication Pilerats, noted the clip was an environmental statement saying that "Northern NSW and Byron Bay are coastal areas that are currently being destroyed by profit-motivated policies and lobbies, and where marine life and ecosystems are disappearing at an alarming rate. The Australian lifestyle as we know it, the joys of summer, of surfing and living by the beach would not be much without its marine ecosystem and wildlife". "Tieduprightnow" was certified Gold in Australia by  Australian Recording Industry Association (ARIA) in 2021.

18 October 2018, Parcels released the "Withorwithoutyou" film clip. The clip starred American horror actress Milla Jovovich and Danish actor Carsten Nørgaard. The band met the former at the Cannes Film Festival after she has admitted she was a fan. The clip paid homage to classic American slasher films.

The fourth single "Tape" is described by the band as a "surf rock inspired electronic pop song about self-affirmation". The film clip premiered 10 April 2019 and was directed by Carmen Crommelin. The clip starred Pearl Spring Voss, playing Penelope, a character seen on the Parcels album cover. In the film clip Voss is transported from her bedroom to the crowd of Parcels' live performance of the song. The performance was filmed live at Chicago's Lincoln Hall in one-shot in March 2019.

Parcels peaked at number 48 on the official German album charts and number 49 on the French album charts.

2020: Live Vol. 1 
On 30 April 2020, Parcels released their live studio album, Live Vol. 1, an 18 track tape recording mixed on an analog console in the Hansa Studios in Berlin, mastered without any edits. Hansa Studios, located by the remnants of the Berlin Wall, has played hosts to 70s rock icons' sessions such as David Bowie and Iggy Pop.

The album was released amidst the COVID-19 global pandemic. Alongside the album, Parcels released instrumental tutorials for the song "IknowhowIfeel" to their Instagram account. Hill said that "it felt very insensitive and not aware to be releasing anything that wasn't in some way connected to the coronavirus ‘cause that was encapsulating everyone's thoughts".

Live Vol. 1 was released with a video of the recording session. Director Carmen Crommelin, also responsible for directing the "Tape" film clip, said in a press release that she "wanted the camera to be both passive and intimate, so you could politely observe from a distance and walk through the room like a friend".

2021-present: Day/Night 
On 15 June 2021, Parcels released the single "Free" with an accompanying video directed by Carmen Crommelin. On 28 July 2021, Parcels released the single "Comingback". On 15 September 2021, Parcels released the single "Somethinggreater" alongside an announcement of their second album Day/Night, a double album, released on 5 November 2021. The band also embarked on a world tour in 2022, with legs in North America, Europe and Australia.

Musical style 

The band have been compared to musical icons from the 1960s and 70s such as The Beatles and The Beach Boys drawing upon both their look and sound. Their 1970s uniform aesthetic was made a staple after making the guise as a last-minute dress-up for their performance at the 2016 Lollapalooza afterparty, sticking with it ever since.

Parcels' sound has been described as having "an unmistakable penchant for the 70s [...] fusing together the old and the new". In their own words, musically the band draws influence from Steely Dan, Marvin Gaye, The Whitest Boy Alive and Toto. The strong rhythm guitar and 3 part vocals recall some of (fellow Aussie’s) The Bee Gees 1975-79 disco era work. Also, a touch of Kraftwerk’s early EDM is part of their sound.

Notable performances 
On 25 June 2017, Parcels performed at the Glastonbury Festival, at the Silver Hayes Pussy Parlure.

On 12 September 2017, Parcels appeared on US television performing "Overnight" on Conan.

On 8 January 2018, Parcels were interviewed and performed "Overnight", "Anotherclock", and "Older" live on BBC Radio 1.

On 20 September 2018, Parcels performed "Lightenup" live on Neo Magazin Royale.

On 27 December 2019, Parcels performed at Metro Theatre in Sydney, Australia.

On 17 February 2022. Parcels performed "Somethinggreater" from their album Day/Night on The Late Late Show with James Corden.

On August 6 2022, Parcels performed “their best set as a live outfit yet” at Outside Lands Festival according to the San Francisco Chronicle.

On October 27th - Enmore Theatre, Sydney AUS

On October 29th, 30th 2022 - Tivoli, Brisbane AUS

Band members 
 Louie Swain – keyboard, vocals
 Patrick Hetherington – keyboard, guitar, vocals
 Noah Hill – bass guitar, vocals
 Anatole "Toto" Serret – percussion, vocals
 Jules Crommelin – guitar, vocals

Discography

Studio albums

Live albums

Extended plays

Singles

References

External links 
 
 
 

Australian electronic music groups
New South Wales musical groups
Musical groups established in 2014
Electropop groups
Nu-disco musicians
Kitsuné artists
2014 establishments in Australia